Piz Surlej is a mountain in the Bernina Range of the Alps, overlooking Lake Silvaplana in the canton of Graubünden. It lies between the main Engadin valley and the Val Roseg, north of Piz Corvatsch.

References

External links
 Piz Surlej on Hikr

Bernina Range
Mountains of Graubünden
Mountains of the Alps
Alpine three-thousanders
Mountains of Switzerland